Gourav Dhiman (born 16 December 1986) is one of the most experienced players in the India U19 World Cup squad, having played 18 matches and making his debut in February 2004. He is the premier all-rounder in the India squad, bowling right-arm medium-pace and batting right-handed. He had played for India Under-15s and now plays for India Under-19s, Karnataka Under-19s. He regularly opens both the batting and the bowling. To date, he has scored 610 runs at an average of 51.25. He has hit three centuries including a whirlwind 105 off just 75 balls in the final of the Afro-Asian Cup against South Africa. His bowling record is equally impressive, having taken 21 wickets with a strike rate of a wicket every 36 balls.

He was one of the players in the u-19 world cup team which toured Bangladesh a few years ago.

He is currently playing for the Bijapur Bulls in the Karnataka Premier League.

Early life
He received his education at Jain University, Bangalore.

References

Indian cricketers
Karnataka cricketers
1986 births
Living people
Mumbai Indians cricketers